It Never Rains in Southern California is the debut album by Albert Hammond released by Mums Records. The album landed on the Billboard 200 chart, reaching No. 77.

The title song hit No. 2 on the Adult Contemporary chart, No. 5 on the Billboard Hot 100, and No. 51 on the UK Singles Chart in 1972.  The single "Down by the River" hit No. 38 on the Adult Contemporary chart and No. 91 on the Billboard Hot 100.  The single "If You Gotta Break Another Heart" reached No. 63 on the Billboard Hot 100 in 1973. "The Air That I Breathe" would go on to become a major hit for British band the Hollies in 1974.

The album was produced by Hammond and Don Altfeld and was arranged by Michael Omartian.

Track listing 
All tracks by Albert Hammond and Mike Hazlewood.
 "Listen to the World"
 "If You Gotta Break Another Heart"	
 "From Great Britain to L.A."
 "Brand New Day"
 "Anyone Here in the Audience"
 "It Never Rains in Southern California"
 "Names, Tags, Numbers and Labels"
 "Down by the River"
 "The Road to Understanding"
 "The Air That I Breathe"

Personnel
Albert Hammond - lead and backing vocals, guitar
Jay Lewis, Larry Carlton - guitar
Joe Osborn, Ray Pohlman - bass guitar
Hal Blaine, Jim Gordon - drums
Michael Omartian - keyboards
Don Altfeld - percussion
Carol Carmichael - backing vocals

Charts
Album

Singles

References

1972 debut albums
Albert Hammond albums
Columbia Records albums